Optik: International Journal for Light and Electron Optics, or simply Optik (German for Optics) is a peer-reviewed scientific journal covering the optics of light and electrons. According to the Journal Citation Reports, the journal has a 2021 impact factor of 2.84.

See also
 Journal of the Optical Society of America B
 Journal of Lightwave Technology
 Journal of Nonlinear Optical Physics & Materials

References

Optics journals
Elsevier academic journals
English-language journals
Publications established in 1946